Intruders is a 2013 South Korean film written and directed by Noh Young-seok. It was screened in the Contemporary World Cinema section at the 2013 Toronto International Film Festival.

Cast
 Suk-ho Jun
 Tae-kyung Oh

Critical response
Andrew Chan of the Film Critics Circle of Australia writes, "“Intruders” is essentially a Hollywood style gore, slasher, murder thriller that contains the plot of a "Jason X" movie, while being filmed with plenty of cinematic flair and style."

References

External links
 

2013 films
2010s Korean-language films
South Korean mystery thriller films
2010s South Korean films